La folie du doute is a 1920 French silent film directed by René Leprince.

Cast
Yvonne Dupré   
Jean Dax   
Alexandre Arquillière   
Jean Aymé   
Madame Delaunay   
Christiane Delval   
Ernest Maupain   
Madame Valmont

External links 

1920 films
French black-and-white films
Films directed by René Leprince
1920 drama films
French silent feature films
French drama films
Silent drama films
1920s French films